The Olot people (English: Eleut) are an Oirat sub-ethnic group of Choros origin. They were one of the strongest tribes of the Oirats. Today, Mongolian Olots live in Erdenebüren and Ölziit sums. There are a few Olots in Hulunbuir region and 40,000(?) Olots in Xinjiang province of China. Ölziit Olots absorbed into the Khalkha Mongols, and Erdenebüren Olots (3,000 people) retained their Oirat heritage.

See also
Demographics of Mongolia
Dzungar people

External links
 Eleut

Mongol peoples
Ethnic groups in Mongolia
Kalmykia
Kalmyk people
Oirats
Dzungar Khanate